The Louisiana Railroad Bridge carries a single track rail line across the Mississippi River between Louisiana, Missouri and Pike County, Illinois.  Built by the Chicago and Alton Railroad, the structure is currently owned by the Kansas City Southern Railway following a series of sales and consolidation in the railroad industry.

History 
A predecessor of this bridge was opened for service in 1873 as one of the first 15 bridges across the Mississippi River.  The current structure opened to traffic in 1898, having been fully reconstructed on the original piers from the 1873 bridge.  When it opened, the 444 foot swing span was the longest swing span in the nation.

Appearance 
The bridge's distinctive appearance is derived from the variety of truss types installed as different spans were replaced over time.  The most recent span replacement occurred in 1945, when three new spans were installed.

In its closed position, the bridge provides a vertical clearance of 15.8 feet above the normal pool for this section of the Mississippi River.

See also
List of crossings of the Upper Mississippi River
List of brides in the United States

References

External links
Historic Bridges of the United States

Railroad bridges in Missouri
Railroad bridges in Illinois
Bridges over the Mississippi River
Bridges completed in 1873
Kansas City Southern Railway bridges
Alton Railroad
Buildings and structures in Pike County, Missouri
Truss bridges in the United States
Metal bridges in the United States
Interstate railroad bridges in the United States